The Peugeot SR1 is a convertible, hybrid concept car by Peugeot. It was unveiled to the general public at the Geneva Motor Show, in March 2010.

Overview
The SR1 concept incorporates HYbrid4 technology, which was launched in the Peugeot 3008 in 2011. In electric only mode, the car becomes a ZEV (zero emission vehicle), while its combined cycle fuel consumption is only  and 119 g/km of CO2.

Because the SR1 concept was presented together with the new Peugeot brand identity - and its well-known lion - designers all over the world have seemingly been very eager to capture the new design directions chosen by the French giant, in an attempt to understand where the brand would position itself in terms of design, in the near future.

Technical characteristics

Engines

Front, 1.6 L THP

Rear, electric
Synchronous with permanent magnets

THP + Electric

Tires

Transmission
Electronically controlled 6-speed transmission

Performance
(driver only)

Fuel consumption

Dimensions

Others

Gallery

References

External links
 Peugeot SR1 : eagerly expected in...Japan, article knowckers.org

SR1